Just the Way I Am is a 1972 compilation album by the singer-songwriter Dolly Parton. Issued by RCA Camden, RCA's budget reissue division, the album was largely made up of material Parton had recorded between 1967 and 1970 and had released on her earlier albums, and was an attempt to capitalize on Parton's early 1970s success by reissuing earlier material that newer fans might not have been familiar with at the time.

Just the Way I Am and Parton's three subsequent RCA Camden reissues were later rereleased on the Pickwick label during the late 1970s.

Just the Way I Am was released on CD in 1996.

Track listing
"Just The Way I Am" (Dolly Parton)
"Little Bird" (Parton)
"Mama Say A Prayer" (Parton)
"My Blue Ridge Mountain Boy" (Parton)
"In the Good Old Days (When Times Were Bad)" (Parton)
"In the Ghetto" (Scott Davis)
"Daddy Come and Get Me" (Parton, Dorothy Jo Hope)
"The Carroll County Accident" (Bob Ferguson)
"Gypsy, Joe and Me" (Parton)

References

External links
Just the Way I Am at Dolly Parton On-Line

1972 greatest hits albums
Dolly Parton compilation albums
Albums produced by Bob Ferguson (music)